The 1991 British motorcycle Grand Prix was the eleventh round of the 1991 Grand Prix motorcycle racing season. It took place on the weekend of 2–4 August 1991 at Donington Park.

500 cc race report
Kevin Schwantz on pole, Wayne Rainey 0.02 seconds back in 2nd, Mick Doohan 1 second down in 6th. John Kocinski gets the start from 3rd over Wayne Gardner, Doohan and Rainey.

Kocinski opens up a small gap to Schwantz, then a gap to a 3-man fight for 3rd between Rainey, Gardner and Doohan.

Schwantz takes the lead from Kocinski as Rainey arrives to make it a trio. Doohan makes it a quartet on lap 7.

Rainey and Schwantz drop Doohan and Kocinski, and they are swapping the lead often.

On the penultimate lap approaching the Melbourne Hairpin, from far behind Schwantz swoops in on Rainey on the brakes and passes around the outside in one of Schwantz's most memorable overtaking maneuvers.  Rainey is not able to recover while Schwantz widens his lead to a comfortable gap as he crosses the finish line.

500 cc classification

References

British motorcycle Grand Prix
British
Motorcycle Grand Prix